The Americas Zone was one of the three zones of the regional Davis Cup competition in 1999.

In the Americas Zone there were four different tiers, called groups, in which teams compete against each other to advance to the upper tier. Winners in Group II advanced to the Americas Zone Group I. Teams who lost their respective ties competed in the relegation play-offs, with winning teams remaining in Group II, whereas teams who lost their play-offs were relegated to the Americas Zone Group III in 2000.

Participating nations

Draw

 and  relegated to Group III in 2000.
 promoted to Group I in 2000.

First round

Mexico vs. Paraguay

Cuba vs. Haiti

Dominican Republic vs. Peru

Costa Rica vs. Uruguay

Second round

Cuba vs. Mexico

Peru vs. Uruguay

Relegation play-offs

Haiti vs. Paraguay

Costa Rica vs. Dominican Republic

Third round

Peru vs. Mexico

References

External links
Davis Cup official website

Davis Cup Americas Zone
Americas Zone Group II